Calosoma leleupi is a species of ground beetle in the subfamily of Carabinae. It was described by Basilewsky in 1962.

References

leleupi
Beetles described in 1962